Won Tae-in (born April 6, 2000) is a South Korean professional baseball pitcher currently playing for the Samsung Lions of the KBO League. He competed in the 2020 Summer Olympics.

References

External links
 Career statistics and player information from Korea Baseball Organization

 Won Tae-in at Samsung Lions Baseball Club

Samsung Lions players
KBO League pitchers
South Korean baseball players
Olympic baseball players of South Korea
Baseball players at the 2020 Summer Olympics
Sportspeople from Daegu
2000 births
Living people
2023 World Baseball Classic players